The Irish Honeymoon is a 1911 American silent film produced by Kalem Company and distributed by General Film. It was directed by Sidney Olcott with himself and Gene Gauntier in the leading roles.

Cast
 Gene Gauntier - Maggie McClusky
 Sidney Olcott - Larry Malone

Production notes
 The film was shot in Ireland: Queenstown, Cork, Blarney Castle, Muckross abbey, Gap of Dunloe, Killarney lakes, Glencairn, Dublin
 Richard Croker, old Tammany Hall leader, appears in the film.

References
 Michel Derrien, Aux origines du cinéma irlandais: Sidney Olcott, le premier oeil, TIR 2013.  
 Denis Condon, Touristic Work and Pleasure: The Kalem Company in Killarney

External links

The Irish Honeymoon at Irish Film & TV Research Online
 The Irish Honeymoon website dedicated to Sidney Olcott

1911 films
Silent American comedy films
American silent short films
Films set in Ireland
Films shot in Ireland
Films directed by Sidney Olcott
1911 comedy films
1911 short films
American black-and-white films
American comedy short films
1910s American films